Irresistible force may refer to:

 Irresistible force paradox
 Irresistible Force (film), a 1994 American thriller
 Irresistible Force (production identity) or Mixmaster Morris (born 1965), English DJ
 "Irresistible Force" (song), by the Bee Gees, 1997
 "Irresistible Force (Met the Immovable Object)", a song by Jane's Addiction, 2011
 The Irresistible Force, a 1978 novel by Barbara Cartland

See also 
 Irresistible (disambiguation)